Železnik is an urban neighborhood of Belgrade, Serbia.

Železnik (Serbian and ) may also refer to:

 FK Železnik, a football club in Železnik
 Železnik Hall, a sports venue in Železnik
 Železnik (region) (Demir Hisar (region)), a region in North Macedonia

See also 
 Zheleznik (disambiguation)